The men's 110 metres hurdles at the 1934 European Athletics Championships was held in Turin, Italy, at the  Stadio Benito Mussolini on 7 and 8 September 1934.

Medalists

Results

Final
8 September

Semi-finals
7 September

Semi-final 1

Semi-final 2

Heats
7 September

Heat 1

Heat 2

Heat 3

Heat 4

Participation
According to an unofficial count, 17 athletes from 13 countries participated in the event.

 (2)
 (1)
 (1)
 (2)
 (2)
 (1)
 (1)
 (2)
 (1)
 (1)
 (1)
 (1)
 (1)

References

110 metres hurdles
Sprint hurdles at the European Athletics Championships